Tkacz is a Polish occupational surname meaning "weaver". Notable people with this surname include:

 Andrzej Tkacz (born 1946), Polish ice hockey player
 Dawid Tkacz, Polish footballer
 Małgorzata Tkacz-Janik (born 1965), Polish feminist and politician
 Nathaniel Tkacz, academic
 Wojciech Tkacz (born 1969), Polish ice hockey player
 Virlana Tkacz (born 1952), American theatre director

See also
 
 Tkaczyk

Polish-language surnames
Occupational surnames